Eucalyptus populnea, commonly known as poplar box, bimble box or bimbil box, is a species of small to medium-sized tree that is endemic to eastern Australia. It has rough, fibrous or flaky bark on the trunk and branches, egg-shaped, elliptical or more or less round leaves, flower buds arranged in groups of seven to fifteen or more, white flowers and conical, hemispherical or cup-shaped fruit.

Description 
It has rough, fibrous or flaky, greyish bark on the trunk and larger branches, smooth grey bark that is shed in short ribbons from the thinner branches. Flowering occurs from August to December and the flowers are white.

Taxonomy 
Eucalyptus populnea was first formally described in 1858 by botanist Ferdinand von Mueller in Journal of the Proceedings of the Linnean Society, Botany. The specific epithet populnea is a Latin adjective referring to the poplar-like foliage.

The common names bimble box and bimbil box are from the Wiradjuri name for the species. Other common names recorded include round-leaf box, red box, white box, egolla, nankeen gum, round-leaved box and shiny-leaf box.

In 1990, Lawrie Johnson and Ken Hill described two subspecies, populnea and bimbil but the names have not been accepted by the Australian Plant Census.

Hybrids with E. populnea have been recorded but only one, Eucalyptus populnea F.Muell. × Eucalyptus thozetiana  (F.Muell. ex Maiden) R.T.Baker is accepted at the Australian Plant Census.

Distribution and habitat
Poplar box is widespread in New South Wales where it is found on the western plains north from Narrandera and Pooncarie, extending into Queensland as far as Rockhampton. It is most abundant in the northern and central sections on the western plains, becoming gradually less common the New South Wales far west, where it is restricted to areas that are more reliably watered and sandier.

This eucalypt is most commonly found on red soils with a  sandy loam to clay loam texture, growing in association with gum coolibah (E. intertexta), grey box (E. microcarpa) and white cypress pine (Callitris glaucophylla). It can be found less commonly on sandplains composed of deep loamy sands, where it will be found growing  with ironwood (Acacia excelsa) and mulga (Acacia aneura). In the  far west of New South Wales it grows in small terminal drainage depressions with sandy soils overlying clay at depth.

Ecology 
It is a favoured food tree for koalas in the range where it occurs.

Uses 
The flowers of E. populnea produce honey of a good quality, but of limited supply, and which is very dense and pale amber in colour. The timber has been found to be durable and hard and is suitable for fence posts and construction work. However it is not any easy to work timber and is susceptible to white ant attack. It is a suitable species for a windbreak, as it can be propagated easily and is not difficult to establish. It is an excellent fuel, producing a great deal of heat and burns cleanly.

Conservation 
Although it is widespread, the conservation status of E. populnea and allied plant communities is poor. Along the eastern edge of the species' distribution, only a small remnant of some communities occur on the better soil types. There are also a number of minor communities which only occur in limited areas, with very few of these represented in conservation areas such as national parks or nature reserves. 

Protected areas in which significant populations can be found include the Yathong Nature Reserve in New South Wales.

See also 
 List of Eucalyptus species

References 

populnea
Flora of Queensland
Flora of New South Wales
Myrtales of Australia
Drought-tolerant trees
Trees of Australia
Taxa named by Ferdinand von Mueller
Plants described in 1858